Albert Van Den Branden (born 23 March 1910, date of death unknown) was a Belgian field hockey player. He competed in the men's tournament at the 1936 Summer Olympics.

References

External links
 

1910 births
Year of death missing
Belgian male field hockey players
Olympic field hockey players of Belgium
Field hockey players at the 1936 Summer Olympics
Place of birth missing